Dani may refer to:
Dani languages of New Guinea
Western Dani language of New Guinea
Deni language of Brazil